Mauro Ribeiro (Curitiba, 19 July 1964) is a Brazilian former professional road bicycle racer. In the 1991 Tour de France, he became the first and only Brazilian cyclist to win a stage in the Tour de France.

Major results

1982
 1st  Points race, UCI World Junior Track Championships
1983
 3rd  Team pursuit, Pan American Games
1985
 1st  Overall Cinturón Ciclista a Mallorca
1987
 9th Overall Tour de la Communauté Européenne
1988
 9th Grand Prix d'Isbergues
1990
 1st Stage 7 Paris–Nice
1991
 1st Stage 9 Tour de France 
 1st Stage 5 Route du Sud
 5th GP Ouest–France
1995
 3rd  Team pursuit, Pan American Games

External links 

Official Tour de France results for Mauro Ribeiro

Brazilian male cyclists
Brazilian road racing cyclists
Brazilian track cyclists
1964 births
Living people
Brazilian Tour de France stage winners
Olympic cyclists of Brazil
Cyclists at the 1996 Summer Olympics
Sportspeople from Curitiba
Pan American Games medalists in cycling
20th-century Brazilian people
21st-century Brazilian people
Pan American Games bronze medalists for Brazil
Medalists at the 1995 Pan American Games